Garthdee is an area of the city of Aberdeen, Scotland.

Location
Garthdee is south west of the city centre, 3 km from Holburn Junction. It lies on the north side the River Dee, north-west from the Bridge of Dee.

Facilities
The main shops in Garthdee are Asda, B&Q, Boots, Currys, Sainsbury’s and Argos. It is also home to Robert Gordon University, Kaimhill Primary school and a dry ski slope and snowsports centre.

References

Areas of Aberdeen